The 1929–30 National Challenge Cup was the annual open cup held by the United States Football Association. It is now known as the Lamar Hunt U.S. Open Cup.

Eastern Division

Western Division

a) aggregate after 3 games

Final

Sources

 1930 U.S. Open Cup Results

U.S. Open Cup
Nat
Fall River Marksmen